The Swan 45 was designed by German Frers and built by Nautor's Swan and first launched in 2002. The class is recognised by the International Sailing Federation in November 2005 and continues to race around the world with 51 built before the model was discontinued in 2010.

Events

Class World Championships

ORC Offshore Team Racing World Championships
The Swan 45 was used as one of the class within this even in 2004, 2006 and 2008 edition.

Swan Nations Cup
A brand event competing for a "Nations Trophy" the event also commonly incorporates the classes own World Championship.

Newport - Bermuda Race
2004 - "Alliance" - St. Davids Lighthouse Trophy winner - Skipper Dominick Porco

External links

 Official Swan 45 Class Association Website
  ISAF Swan 45 Microsite Website
  ISAF Homepage
 German Frers Official Website
 Nautor Swan

References

Classes of World Sailing
Sailing yachts
Keelboats
2000s sailboat type designs
Sailboat type designs by Germán Frers
Sailboat types built by Nautor Swan